Prvča is a village in Brod-Posavina County in Croatia.

References 

Populated places in Brod-Posavina County